Gulabrao Keshavrao Jedhe (born 9 December 1922) is an Indian politician. He was elected to the Lok Sabha, the lower house of the Parliament of India from Baramati in Maharashtra in 1962 as a member of the Indian National Congress.

References

External links
Official biographical sketch in Parliament of India website

1922 births
Possibly living people
Indian National Congress politicians from Maharashtra
India MPs 1957–1962
India MPs 1962–1967
Lok Sabha members from Maharashtra